The 1941 Navy Midshipmen football team was an American football team that represented the United States Naval Academy as an independent during the 1941 college football season. In their third season under head coach Swede Larson, the Midshipmen compiled a 7–1–1 record, shut out five opponents, and outscored all opponents by a combined score of 192 to 34. In the annual  the Midshipmen beat the Cadets for the third straight year, and finished the season ranked No. 10 in the final AP Poll.

Back Bill Busik and tackle Bill Chewning were selected by the Associated Press as first-team players on the 1941 All-Eastern football team. Tackle Gene Flathmann was named to the second team.

Schedule

Personnel
HB Bill Busik
HB Bob Woods

References

Navy
Navy Midshipmen football seasons
Navy Midshipmen football